Family with sequence similarity 181, member A is a protein that in humans is encoded by the FAM181A gene.

References

Further reading 

Genes
Human proteins